Paul Northfield is a prolific British record producer and sound engineer, who has worked on albums by bands such as Dream Theater, Queensrÿche, Rush, Porcupine Tree and Suicidal Tendencies.

Northfield worked at Advision Studio, London from 1974 to 1978, then at Le Studio, Morin Heights, Quebec from 1978 to 1987, and has been an independent engineer since then.

Selected discography

References

External links
 Interview With Paul Northfield
 Recording Porcupine Tree -  Progressive Rockers Porcupine Tree In the Studio
 Rush's Vapor Trails album - recording the new Vapor Trails CD

British record producers
Year of birth missing (living people)
Living people
British audio engineers
Juno Award for Recording Engineer of the Year winners